Chōbyō is a Japanese masculine given name that may refer to
, Japanese politician
, Japanese comedian

Japanese masculine given names